IPEA may stand for:

 Instituto de Pensamiento Estratégico Ágora, a Mexican think tank
 Instituto de Pesquisa Econômica Aplicada (Institute of Applied Economic Research), a Brazilian government-led economy research organization
 International Preliminary Examination Authority, an examination authority under the Patent Cooperation Treaty (PCT)